The 2018–19 Boston University Terriers men's basketball team represented Boston University during the 2018–19 NCAA Division I men's basketball season. The Terriers, led by eighth-year head coach Joe Jones, played their home games at Case Gym as members of the Patriot League. They finished the season 15–18, 7–11 in Patriot League play to finish in a three-way tie for seventh place. As the No. 8 seed in the Patriot League tournament, they defeated Loyola (MD) in the first round before losing to top-seeded Colgate in the quarterfinals.

Previous season
The Terriers finished the 2017–18 season 15–16, 10–8 in Patriot League play to finish in fifth place. In the Patriot League tournament, they defeated Lehigh in the quarterfinals before losing to Bucknell in the semifinals.

Offseason

Departures

Incoming transfers

2018 recruiting class

2019 recruiting class

Roster

Schedule and results

|-
!colspan=9 style=| Non-conference regular season

|-
!colspan=9 style=| Patriot League regular season

|-
!colspan=9 style=| Patriot League tournament

References

Boston University Terriers men's basketball seasons
Boston University
Boston
Boston